Anthony Michael Dees (born August 6, 1963 in Pascagoula, Mississippi) is a former American hurdler.

Dees won the silver medal at the 1992 Summer Olympics in Barcelona behind Mark McKoy. He then finished third at the 1993 World Indoor Championships, eighth at the 1993 World Championships, third again at the 1997 World Indoor Championships and fourth at the 1999 World Championships.
5 times indoor national champion 60 meter hurdles
He attended the University of Mississippi, and finished his education at Turabo University in Caguas, Puerto Rico.

Dees also was 5 time indoor 60 meter hurdles national champion. Dees ranked #2 in the world in 1991, #3 in the world in 1992 and 1993 in 110 meter hurdles. Dees ended his career at age 38 by posting an impressive 60 meter hurdle best of 7.37 seconds.

Another one of his accomplishments is coaching the University School in Cross Country and leading them to their first ever Boys and Girls trip to the regionals in the school's history. Dees also took four track and field athletes to the state championships which were held in Gainesville at The University of Florida.

Dees was inducted into the Ole Miss track hall of fame by coach Joe Walker at The University Of Mississippi. (Ole Miss)

Personal bests
 110 metres hurdles – 13.05 s (1991)
 100 metres – 10.15 s (1991)
 200 metres – 20.54 s (1984)

See also
 List of sportspeople sanctioned for doping offenses

References
 

1963 births
Living people
American male hurdlers
African-American male track and field athletes
Athletes (track and field) at the 1992 Summer Olympics
Olympic silver medalists for the United States in track and field
Doping cases in athletics
American sportspeople in doping cases
People from Pascagoula, Mississippi
Track and field athletes from Mississippi
University of Mississippi alumni
Medalists at the 1992 Summer Olympics
Universiade medalists in athletics (track and field)
Goodwill Games medalists in athletics
Universiade gold medalists for the United States
Medalists at the 1989 Summer Universiade
Competitors at the 1990 Goodwill Games
21st-century African-American people
20th-century African-American sportspeople